Senator Bloomfield may refer to:

Allen J. Bloomfield (1883–1932), New York State Senate
Dave Bloomfield (born 1946), Nebraska State Senate